Rhea or Rheia (Ancient Greek: Ῥέα  or Ῥεία ) is a mother goddess in ancient Greek religion and Greek mythology, the Titaness daughter of the earth goddess Gaia and the sky god Uranus, himself a son of Gaia. She is the older sister of Cronus, who was also her consort, and the mother of the five eldest Olympian gods Hestia, Demeter, Hera, Poseidon and Zeus; and Hades, king of the Underworld.

When Cronus learnt that he was destined to be overthrown by one of his children like his father was before him, he swallowed all the children Rhea bore as soon as they were born. When Rhea had her sixth and final child, Zeus, she spirited him away and hid him in Crete, giving Cronus a rock to swallow instead, thus saving her youngest son who would go on to challenge his father's rule and rescue the rest of his siblings. Following Zeus' defeat of Cronus and the rise of the Olympian gods into power, Rhea withdraws her role as the queen of the gods to become a supporting figure on Mount Olympus. She has some roles and myths in the new Olympian era; she attended the birth of her grandson Apollo and raised her other grandson Dionysus; after Persephone was abducted by Hades, Rhea was sent to Demeter by Zeus; while in the myth of Pelops, she resurrects the unfortunate youth after he was slain.

In early traditions, she is known as "the mother of gods" and therefore is strongly associated with Gaia and Cybele, who have similar functions. The classical Greeks saw her as the mother of the Olympian gods and goddesses. The Romans identified her with Magna Mater (their form of Cybele), and the Goddess Ops.

Etymology

Alternatively, the name Rhea may be connected with words for the pomegranate: , and later .

The name Rhea may ultimately derive from a Pre-Greek or Minoan source.

Family 
Rhea is the sister of the Titans (Oceanus, Crius, Hyperion, Iapetus, Coeus, Themis, Theia, Phoebe, Tethys, Mnemosyne, Cronus and sometimes Dione), the Cyclopes, the Hecatoncheires, the Giants, the Meliae, the Erinyes, and the half-sister of Aphrodite (in some versions), Typhon, Python, Pontus, Thaumas, Phorcys, Nereus, Eurybia and Ceto.

According to Hesiod, Rhea had six children with Cronus: Hestia, Demeter, Hera, Hades, Poseidon, and Zeus in that order. The philosopher Plato recounts that Rhea, Cronus and Phorcys were the eldest children of Oceanus and Tethys.

According to the Orphic myths, Zeus wanted to marry his mother Rhea. After Rhea refused to marry him, Zeus turned into a snake and raped her. She had Persephone with Zeus.

Mythology

Birth and children 
Rhea was born to the earth goddess Gaia and the sky god Uranus, one of their twelve (or thirteen) Titan children. According to Hesiod, Uranus imprisoned all his children, while Apollodorus states he only imprisoned the Cyclopes and the Hecatoncheires, not the Titans. With the help of Gaia, the youngest child, Cronus, overthrew his father, became king in his place, freed his siblings, and took his sister Rhea to wife. Ophion and Eurynome, a daughter of Oceanus, were said to have ruled snowy Mount Olympus in the early age. Rhea and Cronus fought them, and threw them into the waves of the Ocean, thus becoming rulers in their place. Rhea, skilled in wrestling, battled Eurynome specifically.

Gaia and Uranus told Cronus that just as he had overthrown his own father and become ruler of the cosmos, he was destined to be overcome by his own child; so as each of his children was born, Cronus swallowed them. Rhea, Uranus and Gaia devised a plan to save the last of them, Zeus. Rhea gave birth to Zeus in a cavern on the island of Crete, and gave Cronus a stone wrapped in swaddling clothes, which he promptly swallowed; Rhea hid her infant son Zeus in a cave on Mount Ida. Her attendants, the warrior-like Kouretes and Dactyls, acted as a bodyguard for the infant Zeus, helping to conceal his whereabouts from his father. In some accounts, by the will of Rhea a golden dog guarded a goat which offered her udder and gave nourishment to the infant Zeus. Later on, Zeus changed the goat into an immortal among the stars while the golden dog that guarded the sacred spot in Crete was stolen by Pandareus.

In an obscure version, attested only on the east frieze of a temple at Lagina, the goddess of crossroads Hecate assisted Rhea in saving Zeus from his father. The frieze shows Hecate presenting to Cronus the swaddled stone while the real infant is being whisked away in safety.

While Zeus was still an infant hidden in Crete, Rhea caught her husband Cronus with his mistress the nymph Philyra in the act; Cronus then transformed into a horse and galloped away, in order not to be seen by his wife.

In some accounts, Rhea along with Metis gave Cronus the potion that made him disgorge the children he had eaten.

Olympian era 
Following Zeus' ascension, Rhea withdrew from spotlight as she was no longer queen of gods, but remained an ally of her children and their families.

In some traditions, Rhea disapproved of her children Hera and Zeus getting married, so the two had to elope in order to be together. Rhea was present in the birth of her grandson Apollo, along with many other goddesses, the most notable exceptions being Hera and Eileithyia, the goddess of childbirth, whose absence left Leto in terrible agony. Rhea was said to be a goddess who eased childbirth for women.

After Demeter reunited with her daughter Persephone, Zeus sent Rhea to persuade Demeter to return to Olympus and rejoin the gods.

Rhea raised another one of her grandsons, Dionysus, after the fiery death of his mother, the mortal princess Semele. Later on she went on to heal Dionysus' raging madness, which had been inflicted on him by the jealous Hera, causing him to wander around aimlessly for some time. Rhea gave Dionysus the amethyst, which was thought to prevent drunkenness. Rhea sometimes joined Dionysus and his Maenads in their frenzy dances.

According to Bacchylides, it was Rhea herself who restored Pelops to life after his father Tantalus cut him down.

Rhea and Aphrodite rescued Creusa, the wife of Aphrodite's son Aeneas, from the slavery the Greeks would have subjected her to after the fall of Troy. As for Aeneas, when he landed in Italy, a local warlord named Turnus set his pine-framed vessels ablaze. Rhea (or Cybele), remembering that those hulls had been crafted from trees felled on her holy mountains, transformed the vessels into sea nymphs.

After Melanion won the hand of Atalanta in marriage thanks to the help he received from Aphrodite, he neglected to thank her. Thus the goddess inflicted them with great passion for each other when they were near a temple of Rhea. The two then proceeded to have sex inside the temple. In anger, Rhea turned them into lions.

At some point, a mortal man named Sangas offended the goddess, and she turned him into a river that bore his name; Sangarius (now Sakarya River) in Asia Minor.

Once, a Phrygian man named Pyrrhus tried to rape Rhea; the goddess changed him into stone for his hubris.

In one Orphic myth, Zeus was filled with desire for his mother and pursued her, only for Rhea to refuse him and change into a serpent to flee. Zeus also turned himself into a serpent and raped her. The child born from that union was their daughter Persephone, and afterwards Rhea became Demeter. The child, Persephone, was born so deformed that Rhea ran away from her frightened, and did not breastfeed her daughter.

Cult

Rhea had "no strong local cult or identifiable activity under her control". She was originally worshiped on the island of Crete, identified in mythology as the site of Zeus' infancy and upbringing. Her cults employed rhythmic, raucous chants and dances, accompanied by the tympanon (a wide, handheld drum), to provoke a religious ecstasy. Her priests impersonated her mythical attendants, the Curetes and Dactyls, with a clashing of bronze shields and cymbals.

The tympanon's use in Rhea's rites may have been the source for its use in Cybele's – in historical times, the resemblances between the two goddesses were so marked that some Greeks regarded Cybele as their own Rhea, who had deserted her original home on Mount Ida in Crete and fled to Mount Ida in the wilds of Phrygia to escape Cronus.

Rhea was often referred to as Meter Theon (“Mother of the Gods”) and there were several temples around Ancient Greece dedicated to her under that name. Pausanias mentioned temples dedicated to Rhea under the name Meter Theon in Anagyros in Attika, Megalopolis in Arkadia, on the Acropolis of Ancient Corinth, and in the district of Keramaikos in Athens, where the statue was made by Pheidias. In Sparta there was further more a sanctuary to Meter Megale (“[the] Great Mother”). Olympia had both an altar and a temple to the Meter Theon: 
 A temple of no great size [at Olympia] in the Doric style they have called down to the present day Metroion (Temple of the Mother), keeping its ancient name. No image lies in it of the Meter Theon (Mother of the Gods), but there stand in it statues of Roman emperors.

Her temple in Akriai, Lakedaimon was said to be her oldest sanctuary in the Peloponnese: 
 Well worth seeing here [at Akriai, Lakedaimon] are a temple and marble image of the Meter Theon (Mother of the Gods). The people of Akriai say that this is the oldest sanctuary of this goddess in the Peloponnesus.

Statues of her were also standing in the sanctuaries of other gods and in other places, such as a statue of Parian marble by Damophon in Messene. The scene in which Rhea gave Chronos a stone in the place of Zeus after his birth was assigned to have taken place on Petrakhos Mountain in Arcadia as well as on Mount Thaumasios in Arcadia, both of which were holy places: 
 Mount Thaumasios (Wonderful) lies beyond the river Maloitas [in Arkadia], and the Methydrians hold that when Rhea was pregnant with Zeus, she came to this mountain and enlisted as her allies, in case Kronos should attack her, Hopladamos and his few Gigantes. They allow that she gave birth to her son on some part of Mount Lykaios, but they claim that here Kronos was deceived, and here took place the substitution of a stone for the child that is spoken of in the Greek legend. On the summit of the mountain is Rhea's Cave, into which no human beings may enter save only the women who are sacred to the goddess.

The center of the worship of Rhea was however on Crete, where Mount Ida was said to be the birthplace of Zeus. Reportedly, there was a "House of Rhea" in Knossos: 
 The Titanes had their dwelling in the land about Knosos [in Krete], at the place where even to this day men point out foundations of a house of Rhea and a cypress grove which has been consecrated to her from ancient times.

Upon Mount Ida, there was a cave sacred to Rhea:
 In Crete there is said to be a sacred cave full of bees. In it, as storytellers say, Rhea gave birth to Zeus; it is a sacred place and no one is to go near it, whether god or mortal. At the appointed time each year a great blaze is seen to come out of the cave. Their story goes on to say that this happens whenever the blood from the birth of Zeus begins to boil up. The sacred bees that were the nurses of Zeus occupy this cave.

Iconography

Rhea only appears in Greek art from the fourth century BC, when her iconography draws on that of Cybele; the two therefore, often are indistinguishable; both can be shown wearing a crown (either a Mural crown or a Polos), seated on a throne flanked by lions, riding a lion, and on a chariot drawn by two lions. In Roman religion, her counterpart Cybele was Magna Mater deorum Idaea, who was brought to Rome and was identified in Roman mythology as an ancestral Trojan deity. On a functional level, Rhea was thought equivalent to Roman Ops or Opis.

Depiction in ancient literature
In Homer, Rhea is the mother of the gods, although not a universal mother like Cybele, the Phrygian Great Mother, with whom she was later identified.

In the Argonautica by Apollonius of Rhodes, the fusion of Rhea and Phrygian Cybele is completed. "Upon the Mother depend the winds, the ocean, the whole earth beneath the snowy seat of Olympus; whenever she leaves the mountains and climbs to the great vault of heaven, Zeus himself, the son of Cronus, makes way, and all the other immortal gods likewise make way for the dread goddess," the seer Mopsus tells Jason in Argonautica; Jason climbed to the sanctuary high on Mount Dindymon to offer sacrifice and libations to placate the goddess, so that the Argonauts might continue on their way. For her temenos they wrought an image of the goddess, a xoanon, from a vine-stump. There "they called upon the mother of Dindymon, mistress of all, the dweller in Phrygia, and with her Titias and Kyllenos who alone of the many Cretan Daktyls of Ida are called 'guiders of destiny' and 'those who sit beside the Idaean Mother'." They leapt and danced in their armour: "For this reason the Phrygians still worship Rhea with tambourines and drums".

Descendants

Significant modern namesakes 
 The name of the bird species Rhea is derived from the goddess's name Rhea.<ref>C. Michael Hogan. 2009. [http://www.globaltwitcherea: Rhea pinnata, GlobalTwitcher.com, ed. N. Stromberg] </ref>
 Rhea, the second largest moon of the planet Saturn is named after her.

Notes

References

 Apollodorus, Apollodorus, The Library, with an English Translation by Sir James George Frazer, F.B.A., F.R.S. in 2 Volumes. Cambridge, Massachusetts, Harvard University Press; London, William Heinemann Ltd. 1921. Online version at the Perseus Digital Library.
 Apollonius Rhodius, Argonautica translated by Robert Cooper Seaton (1853–1915), R. C. Loeb Classical Library Volume 001. London, William Heinemann Ltd, 1912. Online version at the Topos Text Project.
 Anonymous, The Homeric Hymns and Homerica with an English Translation by Hugh G. Evelyn-White. Homeric Hymns. Cambridge, MA.,Harvard University Press; London, William Heinemann Ltd. 1914. Online version at the Perseus Digital Library.
 Antoninus Liberalis, The Metamorphoses of Antoninus Liberalis translated by Francis Celoria (Routledge 1992). Online version at the Topos Text Project.
 Caldwell, Richard, Hesiod's Theogony, Focus Publishing/R. Pullins Company (June 1, 1987). .
 Callimachus. Hymns, translated by Alexander William Mair (1875–1928). London: William Heinemann; New York: G.P. Putnam's Sons. 1921. Online version at the Topos Text Project.
 Clement of Alexandria, Recognitions from Ante-Nicene Library Volume 8, translated by Smith, Rev. Thomas. T. & T. Clark, Edinburgh. 1867. Online version at theoi.com
 Diodorus Siculus, Diodorus Siculus: The Library of History. Translated by Charles Henry Oldfather. Twelve volumes. Loeb Classical Library. Cambridge, Massachusetts: Harvard University Press; London: William Heinemann, Ltd. 1989.Online version at the Lacus Curtius: Into the Roman World.
 Fowler, R. L. (2013), Early Greek Mythography: Volume 2: Commentary, Oxford University Press, 2013. .
 Fulgentius, Mythologies translated by Whitbread, Leslie George. Ohio State University Press.1971. Online version at theoi.com
 Gantz, Timothy, Early Greek Myth: A Guide to Literary and Artistic Sources, Johns Hopkins University Press, 1996, Two volumes:  (Vol. 1),  (Vol. 2).
 Graves, Robert, The Greek Myths: The Complete and Definitive Edition. Penguin Books Limited. 2017. 
 Grimal, Pierre, The Dictionary of Classical Mythology, Wiley-Blackwell, 1996. .
 Hard, Robin, The Routledge Handbook of Greek Mythology: Based on H.J. Rose's "Handbook of Greek Mythology", Psychology Press, 2004, . Google Books.
 Hesiod, The Homeric Hymns and Homerica with an English Translation by Hugh G. Evelyn-White, Cambridge, MA.,Harvard University Press; London, William Heinemann Ltd. 1914. Online version at the Perseus Digital Library.
 Homer, The Iliad with an English Translation by A.T. Murray, Ph.D. in two volumes. Cambridge, MA., Harvard University Press; London, William Heinemann, Ltd. 1924. Online version at the Perseus Digital Library.
 Homer, The Odyssey with an English Translation by A.T. Murray, Ph.D. in two volumes. Cambridge, MA., Harvard University Press; London, William Heinemann, Ltd. 1919. Online version at the Perseus Digital Library.Homeric Hymn 2 to Demeter, in The Homeric Hymns and Homerica with an English Translation by Hugh G. Evelyn-White, Cambridge, Massachusetts, Harvard University Press; London, William Heinemann Ltd. 1914. Online version at the Perseus Digital Library.Homeric Hymn 3 to Apollo, in The Homeric Hymns and Homerica with an English Translation by Hugh G. Evelyn-White, Cambridge, Massachusetts, Harvard University Press; London, William Heinemann Ltd. 1914. Online version at the Perseus Digital Library.
Hopkinson, N, "Rhea in Callimachus' Hymn to Zeus" in The Journal of Hellenic Studies, Vol. 104 (1984), 176–177. 
 Hyginus, Fabulae from The Myths of Hyginus translated and edited by Mary Grant. University of Kansas Publications in Humanistic Studies. Online version at the Topos Text Project.
 Johnston, Sarah Iles, (1991). Restless Dead: Encounters Between the Living and the Dead in Ancient Greece. 
 Kerényi, Karl (1976), Dionysos: Archetypal image of indestructible life, trans. Ralph Manheim, Princeton University Press, 1976. .
 Kern, Otto. Orphicorum Fragmenta, Berlin, 1922. Internet Archive.
 Lycophron, Alexandra (or Cassandra) in Callimachus and Lycophron with an English translation by A. W. Mair ; Aratus, with an English translation by G. R. Mair, London: W. Heinemann, New York: G. P. Putnam 1921 . Internet Archive
 Meisner, Dwayne A., Orphic Tradition and the Birth of the Gods, Oxford University Press, 2018. .
 Nonnus, Dionysiaca translated by William Henry Denham Rouse (1863–1950), from the Loeb Classical Library, Cambridge, MA, Harvard University Press, 1940.  Online version at the Topos Text Project.
 Oppian, Cynegetica in Oppian, Colluthus, Tryphiodorus, With an English Translation by A. W. Mair,  London, W. Heinemann, 1928. Internet Archive.
 Ovid, Metamorphoses translated by Brookes More (1859–1942). Boston, Cornhill Publishing Co. 1922. Online version at the Topos Text Project.
 Pausanias, Pausanias Description of Greece with an English Translation by W.H.S. Jones, Litt.D., and H.A. Ormerod, M.A., in 4 Volumes. Cambridge, MA, Harvard University Press; London, William Heinemann Ltd. 1918. Online version at the Perseus Digital Library.
 Plato, Cratylus in Plato in Twelve Volumes, Vol. 12 translated by Harold N. Fowler, Cambridge, Massachusetts, Harvard University Press; London, William Heinemann Ltd. 1925. Online version at the Perseus Digital Library.
 Plato, Timaeus in Plato in Twelve Volumes, Vol. 9 translated by W.R.M. Lamb, Cambridge, Massachusetts, Harvard University Press; London, William Heinemann Ltd. 1925. Online version at the Perseus Digital Library.
 Strabo,  Geography, Editors, H.C. Hamilton, Esq., W. Falconer, M.A., London. George Bell & Sons. 1903. Online version at the Perseus Digital Library
 Tripp, Edward, Crowell's Handbook of Classical Mythology, Thomas Y. Crowell Co; First edition (June 1970). .
 Valerius Flaccus, Argonautica translated by Mozley, J H. Loeb Classical Library Volume 286. Cambridge, MA, Harvard University Press; London, William Heinemann Ltd. 1928. Online version at theoi.com.
 Virgil, Aeneid. Theodore C. Williams. trans. Boston. Houghton Mifflin Co. 1910. Online version at the Perseus Digital Library.
 Virgil, Georgics in Bucolics, Aeneid, and Georgics Of Vergil. J. B. Greenough. Boston. Ginn & Co. 1900. Online version at the Perseus Digital Library.
 West, M. L. (1983), The Orphic Poems'', Clarendon Press Oxford, 1983. .

External links
 
 RHEA from The Theoi Project
 RHEA from Greek Mythology Link
 RHEA from greekmythology.com
 RHEA from Mythopedia

Cretan mythology
Greek goddesses
Earth goddesses
Fertility goddesses
Food goddesses
Food deities
Mother goddesses
Children of Gaia
Titans (mythology)
 
Children of Oceanus
Mountain goddesses
Saturnian deities
Divine women of Zeus
Mythological rape victims
Cybele
Lion deities
Deeds of Zeus
Deeds of Demeter
Mothers of the twelve Olympians
Greek mythology of Anatolia
Women of the Trojan war
Deities in the Iliad
Shapeshifters in Greek mythology